Del Vecchio may refer to:

Del Vecchio (guitar maker), guitarmaking company
Del Vecchio (surname)
Delvecchio (TV series), American drama television series